What becomes a legend most? may refer to:

 An advertising tagline for mink fur from the American Legend Cooperative
 What Becomes a Legend Most, a 1989 album by Jermaine Stewart
What Becomes a Legend Most: A Biography of Richard Avedon, a 2002 book by Philip Gefter